Úrsula Corberó Delgado (born 11 August 1989) is a Spanish actress. She became known in Spain for playing Ruth Gómez in the teen drama series Physics or Chemistry (2008–2010), Margarita de Austria in the historical fiction series Isabel (2014), and Marta in the comedy film Girl's Night Out (2015). She gained international recognition for her role as Tokyo in the crime drama series Money Heist (2017–2021) and made her Hollywood debut in the superhero film Snake Eyes (2021).

Early life 
Úrsula Corberó Delgado was born in Barcelona on 11 August 1989, the daughter of shopkeeper Esther Delgado and carpenter Pedro Corberó. She is ethnically Catalan, and grew up in Sant Pere de Vilamajor. She has a sister named Mónica. By age six, she already knew she wanted to be an actress and later started acting in commercials. She got her first part at age 13 and took acting classes, as well as flamenco and jazz dance classes.

Career 

After completing her studies, Corberó moved to Madrid to shoot the TV series Física o Química. She debuted as Maria in the television series Mirall Trencat in 2002. She appeared as Sara in Ventdelplà in 2005–06, and in series Cuenta atrás in 2007. In 2008, she portrayed Manuela Portillo in series El Internado and began working on the Antena 3 television series Física o química until 2010. Her character, Ruth Gomez, suffered from bulimia. The series attracted a lot of controversy but Corberó has been critically acclaimed for her performance.

After leaving Física o Química, in 2011, Corberó landed a main-role in Televisión Española's drama series 14 de abril. La República. The show's second season didn't air until November 2018 due to political conflicts with the People's Party. The same year, she starred in the horror film XP3D alongside her Física o Química co-star and friend Maxi Iglesias. Despite an important campaign of promotion, the film failed to convince the critics.

In 2012, she shot the television movie Los días de gloria which was also postponed due to political conflicts and broadcast in July 2013. Then, she joined the third season of La 1's series Gran Reserva in the role of Julia Cortazar. The same year, she was directed by Joaquín Oristrell in the Catalan TV movie Volare. Then she participated in the horror film Afterparty, which also failed to convince both the critics and the public. At the end of the year, she flew to Colombia to shoot Crimen con vista al Mar with Carmelo Gómez.

In 2013, she starred in the comedy ¿Quién mató a Bambi? alongside actors Clara Lago and Quim Gutiérrez. The film was well received by the critics and the public. The same year, she lent her voice to Sam in Cloudy with a Chance of Meatballs 2.

In 2014, she played Margarita de Austria in the successful historical series Isabel. The same year, she became the first actress in history to receive the Untameable Award at the Sitges Film Festival, rewarding her career. Men's Health's magazine named her Woman of the Year, an award that she received from the hand of her friend and legendary actress, Rossy de Palma.

In 2015, Corberó went to Trento to shoot La Dama Velata, a Spanish-Italian coproduction starring Miriam Leone, Andrea Bosca and Aura Garrido. Later this year, she played Natalia de Figueroa y Martorell in the Spanish sitcom Anclados alongside actress Rossy de Palma.

In March 2015, she starred as Nadia in Perdiendo el Norte alongside the actors Blanca Suarez and Yon Gonzalez. This same year, she received the Ciudad de Alicante Award, an award created by the Alicante Film Festival to encourage Spanish young talents. In December 2015, she landed a main-role in the new thriller series written by the creators of Gran Hotel, La Embajada. The series was presented at Cannes during the MIPTV and bought by the American network UniMás.

In 2015, she also landed her first main role in a movie in Cómo sobrevivir a una despedida and confirmed she's one of the best comical actresses of Spain. The film was presented at the Málaga Film Festival in the official competition and was nominated for Best Picture.

In 2016, she reprised her role of Margarita de Austria in the movie La corona partida. The film is a continuation of the series Isabel and Carlos, rey emperador. The same year, she repeated the dubbing experience by lending her voice to Katie in The Secret Life of Pets.

In 2017, Corberó landed a main role in the heist television series La Casa de Papel (Money Heist). She plays Tokyo, the narrator of the story, a runaway robber who is scouted by the Professor to participate in his plan. The series, created by Álex Pina, who previously wrote Vis a Vis, is characterized by its dark humor, its anticapitalist discourse and the importance of women. It first aired in Spain on Antena 3 and was later made available internationally through Netflix. For the first time in her career, Úrsula Corberó is acclaimed by the critics and the audience who see in this part a "before and after" in her career, in rupture with her previous roles. She was nominated for Best Actress in a TV Series at the Premios Feroz and won an Atv Award for Best Actress. The series won Best Drama Series at the 46th International Emmy Awards. It became a worldwide hit and is the most viewed non-English speaking series on the platform.

Later that year, she was given her first main dramatic role in cinema by Julio Medem. The Tree of Blood is a thriller and Corberó is Rebecca, a mysterious woman who, along with her husband, discover secrets from her family. The actress was also directed by Isabel Coixet for the movie Proyecto Tiempo: La Llave. The film debuted at the San Sebastian Film Festival.

In 2018, she is given her first English-speaking role in the American crime-drama series Snatch. She stars alongside actors Rupert Grint and Luke Pasqualino.

In 2019, she appeared as herself in the Spanish comedy series Paquita Salas.

In 2020, she starred in the music video of Un Día (One Day), a song by J Balvin, Dua Lipa, Bad Bunny and Tainy.

In late 2019, Corberó was announced as playing G.I. Joe villain the Baroness in Snake Eyes, a spin-off from the G.I. Joe franchise. The film, directed by Robert Schwentke and starring actors Henry Golding, Andrew Koji and Samara Weaving, was released on 23 July 2021 in Dolby Cinema and IMAX. It was made available to stream on Paramount+ 45 days after its theatrical debut.

In April 2022, Corberó joined the cast of Netflix's action film entitled Lift, starring Gugu Mbatha-Raw, Kevin Hart, Vincent D'Onofrio and Paul Anderson, among others. The film is directed by F. Gary Gray, produced by Matt Reeves and will premiere on August 25, 2023.

In September 2022, Corberó was announced as the lead of Netflix's new miniseries, based on a real story, entitled El cuerpo en llamas. She will play Rosa Peral, agent of the Guàrdia Urbana and wife of fellow agent Pedro Rodríguez, whose body was found carbonized in a car near Pantano de Foix in 2017.

Public image 
Since October 2018, Corberó has been the ambassador of the Fiorever collection by Bulgari. She's been the face of several brands over the years such as Tampax (2011 and 2014), Stradivarius (2014), Maybelline (from 2015 to 2017), Calzedonia (2015) and Falabella (2019). She created the Harajuku collection for the eyewear brand Multiopticas in 2018.

In 2020, Corberó posed for the French fashion designer Simon Porte Jacquemus during the #JacquemusAtHome campaign. In 2021, she became the global ambassador of the Japanese cosmetics producer, Shiseido.

Corberó is considered a "fashion icon" and created buzz with her Teresa Helbig dress, which featured an lateral opening that showed her leg, at the 30th Goya Awards. She has denied rumors of anorexia, attributing her physique to a healthy diet and various forms of exercise, including pilates.

Corberó is ethnically Catalan but does not have an opinion on the Catalan independence movement. Following the outcome of the 2017 Catalan independence referendum, she tweeted that she was "heartbroken" by the ensuing police violence.

In May 2018, thanks to the worldwide success of La Casa de Papel, Corberó became the most followed Spanish celebrity on Instagram with more than 5 million followers. She currently has over 22 million followers.

Charity work 
Corberó is a feminist. In 2018, she participated in a video in favor of the legalization of abortion in Argentina.

Corberó is the co-founder of Ymas, a company of artists that allows people to attend film premieres, behind the scenes, and more.

Corberó has participated in several breast cancer awareness campaigns with actresses Blanca Suarez and Clara Lago. She is also committed to childhood cancer with the Atresmedia Foundation.

Corberó also uses her platform to raise awareness about climate change and was a jury member of the 4th edition of the We Art Water Film Festival. In 2020, she participated to #REInventaElSistema, a campaign launched by Greenpeace to raise awareness about climate change following the COVID-19 pandemic, alongside personalities like anthropologist Jane Goodall, singer Alejandro Sanz, and actress Elena Anaya.

Personal life 
Corberó dated actor Israel Rodríguez from 2009 to 2011, tennis player Feliciano López for five months in 2011, and model Andrés Velencoso from 2013 to 2016.

Since 2016, Corberó has been in a relationship with Argentine actor Chino Darín, whom she met on the set of the television series The Embassy.

Filmography

Film

Television

Music video

Theater

Awards and nominations

References

External links 

 
 

1989 births
Living people
Actresses from Barcelona
Child actresses from Catalonia
Television actresses from Catalonia
Film actresses from Catalonia
Stage actresses from Catalonia
Spanish feminists
Spanish film actresses
Spanish television actresses
21st-century Spanish actresses
Activists from Catalonia
Spanish women activists
Web series actresses
People from Barcelona